Andrew P. Baukol is an American financial policy advisor who served as the acting United States secretary of the treasury for the first week of the Biden administration. Baukol served in an interim capacity until Biden's nominee, Janet Yellen, was confirmed by the United States Senate. He then became Treasury's acting Under Secretary for International Affairs.

Education 
Baukol earned a Bachelor of Science degree from the Walsh School of Foreign Service at Georgetown University and a Master of Arts in economics from the University of Minnesota.

Career 
From 1989 to 1996, Baukol worked for the Central Intelligence Agency as an economic analyst. From 2001 to 2004, he was a senior advisor at the International Monetary Fund. Baukol then joined the United States Department of the Treasury, where he helped manage policy related to the Exchange Stabilization Fund. Baukol also served as principal deputy assistant secretary for international monetary policy. In 2021, then-Treasury Secretary Steven Mnuchin appointed Baukol as the agency's presidential transition director.

References 

20th-century births
21st-century American politicians
Place of birth missing (living people)
Biden administration personnel
Biden administration cabinet members
Living people
United States Department of the Treasury officials
Year of birth missing (living people)
Acting United States Secretaries of the Treasury
People of the Central Intelligence Agency
International Monetary Fund people